The value of control is a quantitative measure of the value of controlling the outcome of an uncertain variable. Decision analysis provides a means for calculating the value of both perfect and imperfect control. The former value, informally known as the value of wizardry, is an upper bound for the latter. Obtaining meaningful value-of-control measurements requires an awareness of important restrictions (concerning the nature of free will and the meaning of counterfactual statements) on the validity of this kind of analysis.

See also
Value of information
Wizard

Valuation (finance)
Free will